Benedek Tomcsányi (born 31 October 2001) is a Hungarian artistic gymnast.

Career 
Benedek Tomcsányi won a bronze in the senior team event at the 2020 European Men's Artistic Gymnastics Championships.

References

Living people
2001 births
Hungarian male artistic gymnasts
Gymnasts from Budapest
21st-century Hungarian people